Bythiospeum alpinum is a species of very small freshwater snails that have an operculum, aquatic gastropod mollusks in the family Hydrobiidae.

It is only known from two locations in central Switzerland, where it is endemic.  It is listed under Swiss law.

See also 
 List of non-marine molluscs of Switzerland

References

Hydrobiidae
Bythiospeum
Endemic fauna of Switzerland
Gastropods described in 1988
Taxonomy articles created by Polbot